The Suwannee River Water Management District (SRWMD) is responsible for managing groundwater and surface water resources in a 15-county region in north-central Florida, United States.  It is the smallest of five Florida water management districts. Its district headquarters are in Live Oak, Florida.

History
The five water management districts were established in 1972 by Chapter 373, Florida Statutes, and were empowered by the electorate in 1976 to assess ad valorem taxes to fund the management of the state’s water resources, and related land resources, to benefit the citizens and the environment. Each water management district is controlled by a Governing Board composed of citizens appointed by the Governor and approved by the Florida Senate. The Florida Department of Environmental Protection has oversight responsibility for the five water management districts.

Function
SRWMD’s hydrological activities include regulating the consumptive use of water, regulating the construction and maintenance of stormwater management systems that serve developed properties in order to protect water quality and prevent flooding, regulating the construction of water wells and the licensure of water well contractors, conducting water supply planning, conducting research on water resource issues, buying and managing environmentally sensitive land, and the operation of flood control structures.

Scope
The Florida counties which are entirely within the SRWMD are: Columbia, Dixie, Gilchrist, Hamilton, Lafayette, Madison, Suwannee, Taylor, and Union. Partial counties include: Alachua, Baker, Bradford, Jefferson, Levy and Putnam.

The major river under the district's control is the Suwannee. The major tributaries are the: Santa Fe, Alapaha and Ichetucknee. Other rivers include the Withlacoochee,  Fenholloway, Aucilla, Steinhatchee, Econfina, Waccasassa and Wacissa.

Recreation opportunities
Suwannee River Water Management District properties offering recreational opportunities include:
Falling Creek Falls, Florida, sightseeing at a 10-foot waterfall
Big Shoals, 28 miles of trails include the Woodpecker multi-use trail and a paddlecraft boat launch
White Springs (Florida)
Little Shoals (Florida)
Gar Pond
Stephen Foster (Florida)
Mattair Springs
Camp Branch (Florida)
Suwannee Springs
Holton Creek
Falmouth Springs
Ellaville (Florida)
Anderson Springs
Black tract
North Mill Creek
South Mill Creek
Owens Spring
Jennings Bluff (Florida)
Devil's Hammock
Atsena Otie
Cabbage Creek 
Cabbage Grove
Goose Pasture
Mallory Swamp
Steinhatchee Springs 
R.O. Ranch
Steinhatchee Falls

See also
Northwest Florida Water Management District
St. Johns River Water Management District
South Florida Water Management District
Southwest Florida Water Management District

References

External links
 Official web site

Water management authorities in the United States
State agencies of Florida
 
1972 establishments in Florida
Government agencies established in 1972
Organizations based in Suwannee County, Florida